List of Guggenheim Fellowships awarded in 1964

See also
Guggenheim Fellowship

References

1964
1964 awards